Köçvəlili (also, Kechvelli, Köçvəlli, and Kochvelili) is a village and municipality in the Agstafa Rayon of Azerbaijan.  It has a population of 2,792.  The municipality consists of the villages of Köçvəlili, Soyuqbulaq, Qarayazı, Həzi Aslanov, and Soyuqbulaqlar.

References 

Populated places in Aghstafa District